The 2007 Birmingham–Southern Panthers football team represented Birmingham–Southern College during the 2007 NCAA Division III football season. This was the first season for the Panthers played after a 68-year hiatus. They managed just one win over a varsity opponent, .

Schedule

References

Birmingham–Southern
Birmingham–Southern Panthers football seasons
Birmingham–Southern Panthers football